The 1982–83 Divizia C was the 27th season of Liga III, the third tier of the Romanian football league system.

Team changes

To Divizia C
Relegated from Divizia B
 CSU Galați
 Flacăra-Automecanica Moreni
 Dacia Orăștie
 Constructorul Iași
 Metalul Plopeni
 Minerul Lupeni
 Victoria Tecuci
 Tractorul Brașov
 CFR Cluj-Napoca
 Relonul Săvinești
 ICIM Brașov
 Minerul Ilba-Seini

Promoted from County Championship
 Zimbrul Suceava
 Constructorul Sfântu Gheorghe
 AZO-TCM Săvinești
 DVA Portul Galați
 FEPA 74 Bârlad
 Metalul Buzău
 Laminorul Brăila
 Dobrogea Canal Basarabi
 ISCIP Ulmeni
 Vâscoza București
 Electrica Titu
 Petrolul Bolintin-Vale
 Progresul Topoloveni
 Armătura Strehaia
 Petrolul Țicleni
 IPC Slatina
 Inter Sibiu
 Soda Ocna Mureș
 Minerul Sărmășag
 Minerul Bihor
 Olimpia Gherla
 Sticla Bistrița
 Textila Prejmer
 Metrom Brașov

From Divizia C
Promoted to Divizia B
 Minerul Gura Humorului
 Borzești
 Prahova Ploiești
 Metalosport Galați
 Dinamo Victoria București
 Rova Roșiori
 Minerul Motru
 Metalurgistul Cugir
 Gloria Reșița
 Armătura Zalău
 Industria Sârmei Câmpia Turzii
 Precizia Săcele

Relegated to County Championship
 Cimentul Bicaz
 Integrata Pașcani
 Textila Buhuși
 Metalul Huși
 Petrolul Berca
 Autobuzul Făurei
 Șoimii Cernavodă
 Marina Mangalia
 Petrolul Roata de Jos
 Electronica Obor București
 Unirea Răcari
 Progresul Pucioasa
 Parângul Novaci
 IOB Balș
 Vitrometan Mediaș
 Automecanica Mediaș
 Chimia Arad
 Recolta Salonta
 Tricolorul Oradea
 Simared Baia Mare
 CIL Blaj
 Unirea Dej
 Metalul Târgu Secuiesc
 Carpați Brașov

Renamed teams 
Foresta Fălticeni was renamed as Chimia Fălticeni.

Zimbrul Suceava was moved from Suceava to Siret and was renamed as Zimbrul Siret.

Victoria IRA Bacău was renamed as Aripile Bacău.

Metalul Sfântu Gheorghe was renamed as Electro Sfântu Gheorghe.

Foresta Gugești was renamed as Victoria Gugești.

Ferodoul Râmnicu Sărat was renamed as Olimpia Râmnicu Sărat.

Vâscoza București was renamed as Viscofil București.

Dunărea Venus Zimnicea was renamed as Dunărea Zimnicea.

CFR Victoria Caransebeș was renamed as CFR Caransebeș.

Explormin Deva was renamed as Explorări Deva.

Minerul Ilba-Seini was renamed as Unirea Seini.

Other changes 
Siretul Pașcani took the place of Nicolina Iași.

Petrolul Brăila took the place of Șantierul Naval ITA Brăila.

Șoimii Cernavodă was spared from relegation due to the merge between FCM Galați and CSU Galați.

League tables

Seria I

Seria II

Seria III

Seria IV

Seria V

Seria VI

Seria VII

Seria VIII

Seria IX

Seria X

Seria XI

Seria XII

See also 
 1982–83 Divizia A
 1982–83 Divizia B
 1982–83 County Championship
 1982–83 Cupa României

References 

Liga III seasons
3
Romania